Bharatpur  is a village in the Bharatpur I CD block in the Kandi subdivision of Murshidabad district in the state of West Bengal, India.

Geography

Location

Area overview
The area shown in the map alongside, covering Berhampore and Kandi subdivisions, is spread across both the natural physiographic regions of the district, Rarh and Bagri. The headquarters of Murshidabad district, Berhampore, is in this area. The entire area is overwhelmingly rural with over 80% of the population living in the rural areas.

Note: The map alongside presents some of the notable locations in the subdivisions. All places marked in the map are linked in the larger full screen map.

Demographics
According to the 2011 Census of India, Bharatpur had a total population of 15,812, of which 8,150 (52%) were males and 7,662 (48%) were females. Population in the age range 0–6 years was 2,040. The total number of literate persons in Bharatpur was 9,100 (66.08% of the population over 6 years).

Civic administration

Police station
Bharatpur police station has jurisdiction over the Bharatpur I CD block.

CD block HQ
The headquarters of the Bharatpur I CD block are located at Bharatpur.

Transport
The Kandi-Katwa Road passes through Bharatpur.

Healthcare
Bharatpur Rural Hospital functions with 30 beds.

References

Villages in Murshidabad district